Thandaung (Phlone) is a small resort town in the Kayin State of south Myanmar. The majority of its population is Karen. It was developed as a hill station by the British.

External links
 "Thandaung Map — Satellite Images of Thandaung" at Maplandia

Township capitals of Myanmar
Populated places in Kayin State